Percy Rivington Pyne I (March 8, 1820 – February 14, 1895) was a migrant from England to the United States. He became president of City National Bank. He was also a director for the Delaware, Lackawanna and Western Railroad and the New Jersey Zinc Company.

Early life 
He was born in England on March 8, 1820, to Anna Rivington and Thomas Pyne. He is a collateral descendant of James Rivington, famed Loyalist publisher in New York during the American Revolution.

He was educated at Christ's Hospital boarding school in West Sussex before emigrating to the United States in 1835.

Career 
Upon arriving in the United States, Pyne joined Moses Taylor & Co. as a clerk, becoming a partner in 1842. Moses Taylor & Co. specialized in the importation and sale of sugar, focusing on the Cuban trade. Pyne managed the sugar business while Taylor expanded the company into finance, iron, coal and railroads.

After the death of his father-in-law in 1882, Pyne became president of National City Bank, which was founded by Taylor in 1865, serving in that role until 1891 when he was succeeded by James Stillman.

Personal life 
In 1855 he married Taylor's daughter Albertina. Their children included two sons and a daughter:

 Moses Taylor Pyne (1855–1921) who was a major philanthropist at Princeton University and who married Margaretta Stockton, granddaughter of General Robert Field Stockton.
 Percy Rivington Pyne II (1857–1929), who married Maud Howland, daughter of New York merchant Gardiner Greene Howland.
 Albertina Taylor Pyne (1859–1918), who married Archibald D. Russell.

Pyne died in Rome, Italy on Valentine's Day, February 14, 1895.

Descendants 
Through his son Percy, he was a grandfather of Grafton Howland Pyne (1890–1935); Herbert Rivington Pyne (1892–1952), who married Florence Ledyard Blair (daughter of banker C. Ledyard Blair); Mary Percy Pyne (b. 1893), who married Oliver Dwight Filley (a grandson of Oliver Filley and cousin of Dwight F. Davis); Percy Rivington Pyne Jr. (1896–1941), a flier with the 103d Aero Squadron during World War I; and Meredith Howland Pyne (b. 1898).

References

External links 

1820 births
1895 deaths
Citigroup people
People educated at Christ's Hospital
Pyne banking family
Rivington family